Anatoly Vladimirovich Dobrovolsky (Russian: Aнатолий Владимирович Добровольский; 1910-1988) was a Soviet architect.

Biography 
Dobrovolsky was born in the village of Buki near Zhytomyr, Ukraine. During 1950-1955, he was the Chief Architect of Kyiv, Ukraine.

Projects 
 Boryspil International Airport, Ukraine (1964–66).
 Bolshevik factory, Kyiv, Ukraine.
 Khreshchatyk metro station in Kyiv.

References 

Soviet architects
1910 births
1988 deaths